The following articles contain lists of Olympic medalists in water polo:

 List of Olympic medalists in water polo (men)
 List of Olympic medalists in water polo (women)